Hotkan (also Romanized as Ḩotkan) is a village in Hotkan Rural District, in the Central District of Zarand County, Kerman Province, Iran. At the 2006 census, its population was 281, in 93 families.

References 

Populated places in Zarand County